Edward R. Olwine (born May 28, 1958) is a retired Major League Baseball pitcher. He played during three seasons at the major league level for the Atlanta Braves.

Amateur career
Olwine played college baseball for Morehead State University. In 1978 and 1979, he played collegiate summer baseball with the Hyannis Mets of the Cape Cod Baseball League, where he was the winning pitcher in the league's 1979 all-star game at Fenway Park, and helped Hyannis win the league championship in both seasons.

Professional career

He was signed by the New York Yankees as an amateur free agent in 1980. Olwine played his first professional season with their Rookie league Paintsville Yankees, Class A (Short Season) Oneonta Yankees, and Class A-Advanced Fort Lauderdale Yankees in 1980, and his last season with the Braves' Triple-A unit, the Richmond Braves, in 1988.

Olwine shares the major league baseball record for most games pitched without a win, at 80.

References

External links

1958 births
Living people
Atlanta Braves players
Major League Baseball pitchers
Baseball players from Ohio
Nashville Sounds players
Paintsville Yankees players
Columbus Clippers players
Greensboro Hornets players
Hyannis Harbor Hawks players
Morehead State Eagles baseball players
Fort Lauderdale Yankees players
Omaha Royals players
Tidewater Tides players
Richmond Braves players
Oneonta Yankees players
People from Greenville, Ohio